Make a Jazz Noise Here is a live double album by Frank Zappa. It was first released in June 1991, and was the third Zappa album to be compiled from recordings from his 1988 world tour, following Broadway the Hard Way (1988) and The Best Band You Never Heard in Your Life (1991). The album's cover art was made by Larry Grossman.

Album content
The album consists largely of instrumentals. Besides many of Zappa's own compositions, there are also some arrangements of Igor Stravinsky and Béla Bartók themes by his bassist, Scott Thunes. The album showcases Mike Keneally on guitar and keyboards. The drummer is Chad Wackerman, a highly regarded musician in the jazz world (he has frequently played with jazz guitarist Allan Holdsworth). A notable contribution to the mix is made by the brass section of the group: Walt Fowler (trumpet), Bruce Fowler (trombone), and saxophonists Paul Carman, Albert Wing and Kurt McGettrick. Ike Willis plays guitar and sings, along with singer/keyboardist Robert 'Bobby' Martin. Ed Mann provides all the percussion and various other sounds, complementing the addition of the Synclavier, which Zappa brought on tour for the first and only time (In the midst of the 1988 tour, Zappa fired the bulk of his band and cancelled the remaining tour primarily due to infighting between specific band members). In the liner notes, Zappa states that the album features no overdubs.

Track listing 
All tracks written by Frank Zappa, except where noted.

Personnel

Musicians 

 Frank Zappa – lead guitar, synth, vocal
 Ike Willis – rhythm guitar, synth, vocal
 Mike Keneally – rhythm guitar, synth, vocal
 Bobby Martin – keyboards, vocal
 Ed Mann – vibes, marimba, electronic percussion 
 Walt Fowler – trumpet, flugel horn, synth
 Bruce Fowler – trombone
 Paul Carman – alto saxophone, soprano saxophone, baritone saxophone
 Albert Wing – tenor saxophone
 Kurt McGettrick – baritone saxophone, contrabass clarinet
 Scott Thunes – electric bass, minimoog
 Chad Wackerman – drums, electronic percussion
 Sampled voices of Senator Hawkins, Senator Holings and Johnny "Guitar" Watson

Production 
 Frank Zappa - producing, arranging, compilation, editing
 Bob Stone - engineering

References

External links 
 Release details

Frank Zappa live albums
1991 live albums
Barking Pumpkin Records albums